Ducks and Drakes is a 1921 American silent comedy film produced and released by Realart Pictures, an offshoot of Paramount Pictures. It was directed by stage producer/director Maurice Campbell and stars Bebe Daniels (also a producer on this film) and Jack Holt. Elmer Harris provided the story and screenplay. A copy is held at the Library of Congress.

Plot

Based upon a summary in a film publication, Teddy Simpson (Daniels) is a wealthy young orphan who, instead of marrying Rob Winslow (Holt), whom her Aunty Weeks (Kelso) has selected for her, is bent upon getting into trouble by seeking adventure and through her flirtatious ways. Rob's friends, victims of her telephone flirtations, offer to help him cure her. Part of the cure involves Teddy taking a ride with Tom Hazzard (Lawrence) to an exclusive gun club, with the other conspirators making things so warm for her that she is cured for all time. When Rob calls her the next day, he finds her ready to consent to a speedy wedding.

Cast

Bebe Daniels as Teddy Simpson
Jack Holt as Rob Winslow
Mayme Kelso as Aunty Weeks
Edward Martindel as Dick Chiltern
W. E. Lawrence as Tom Hazzard
Wade Boteler as Colonel Tweed
Maurie Newell as Cissy
Elsie Andrean as Mina

Status
A DVD was released by Edward Lorusso with a music score by David Drazin in March 2016.

References

External links

Contemporary review in the New York Dramatic Mirror, via Fulton History
Surviving coming attraction lantern slide at the Cleveland Public Library
Lantern slide (George Eastman House)(Wayback Machine)

1921 films
Films based on short fiction
American silent feature films
Silent American comedy films
1921 comedy films
American black-and-white films
Films directed by Maurice Campbell
Surviving American silent films
1920s American films
1920s English-language films